Marcus Kevin O'Riordan (born 25 January 1998) is an English professional cricketer who plays for Kent County Cricket Club.

O'Riordan was born at Pembury in Kent and was educated at Tonbridge School where he played in the school cricket XI. He signed his first professional contract in August 2019 and made his debut for Kent later the same month in a 2019 t20 Blast match against Surrey at Canterbury. He made his first-class debut for Kent in a County Championship match against Nottinghamshire at Nottingham on 10 September 2019.

O'Riordan's parents are from County Cork and he began the 2019 season playing for Muckamore Cricket Club in County Antrim. He trained with Northern Knights and played for the Irish Senior Academy side during the team's tour of England in April 2019 before being called back by Kent where he had been part of the county's Cricket Academy for the previous seven years. He played age-group cricket for the county from under-11 level and first played for Kent's Second XI in 2014. During the 2019/20 northern winter O'Riordan played New South Wales Grade cricket for Belmont.

O'Riordan took his first first-class wickets in Kent's opening match of the 2020 season. After scoring 42 not out in Kent's first innings, he took 3/71 in Essex's first innings. He took a further three wickets in the following match, setting new best bowling figures of 3/50 against Sussex at Canterbury. He made his List A debut on 22 July 2021 in the 2021 Royal London One-Day Cup.

References

External links

1998 births
Living people
English cricketers
Kent cricketers
People from Pembury
English cricketers of the 21st century
People educated at Tonbridge School